Dorcasominae is a subfamily of the longhorn beetle family (Cerambycidae).

Tribes and genera
The family includes five tribes, with numerous genera:

Apatophyseini
Auth: Lacordaire, 1869 - about 97 genera including:
Apatophysis Chevrolat, 1860

Dorcasomini
Auth: Lacordaire, 1868 - monotypic
 Dorcasomus Audinet-Serville, 1834

Protaxini
Auth: Gahan, 1906
 Epitophysis Gressitt & Rondon, 1970
 Protaxis Gahan, 1906

Trigonarthrini
Auth: Villiers, 1984
 Trigonarthron Boppe, 1912
 Varieras Villiers, 1984

Trypogeini
Auth: Vives, 2005 - monotypic
 Trypogeus Lacordaire, 1869

References